Maurice Milton "Maury" Newlin (June 22, 1914 – August 14, 1978) was a Major League Baseball pitcher who played for the St. Louis Browns in  and . From 1942 to 1945 Newlin served in the military during World War II.

References

External links
Baseball Reference.com

1914 births
1978 deaths
St. Louis Browns players
Major League Baseball pitchers
Baseball players from Indiana
American military personnel of World War II